Pterosagittidae is a family of sagittoideans in the order Aphragmophora. It consists of a single genus, Pterosagitta Costa, 1869, which consists of a single species, Pterosagitta draco (Krohn, 1853).

References

Chaetognatha
Monotypic protostome genera